The Remote Sensing and Photogrammetry Society (RSPSoc) is a British learned society devoted to photogrammetry and remote sensing.
It is the UK's adhering body of the International Society for Photogrammetry and Remote Sensing.

RSPSoc resulted from a merger, in 2001,
of the Photogrammetry Society (PSoc) founded in 1952 and the Remote Sensing Society (RSS) founded in 1974.

RSPSoc publishes the International Journal of Remote Sensing, Remote Sensing Letters, and The Photogrammetric Record (all with JCR impact factors).

See also
 American Society for Photogrammetry and Remote Sensing
 British Cartographic Society
 Chartered Institution of Civil Engineering Surveyors
 Royal Institution of Chartered Surveyors

References

Engineering societies based in the United Kingdom
Photogrammetry organizations
Remote sensing organizations
Learned societies of the United Kingdom

tr:RSPSoc